The Swiss degen  was a short sword (Degen), an elongated version of the Swiss dagger, with the same double-crescent shape of the guard.
It was used as a type of side arm in the Old Swiss Confederacy and especially by Swiss mercenaries, from the first half of the 15th century until the mid 16th century.
The native term used in the 15th century for this weapon was baselard. The term Schweizerdegen (as Early New High German ) is first attested in 1499.

Although there was a general trend towards longer blades over time, this development was not linear and disparate blade lengths coexisted throughout the 15th century, and only in the 16th century a more or less discrete split between the short dagger and the long  becomes evident.

These weapons were widely worn both by soldiers and by civilians. They  were  very popular with the Swiss mercenary pikemen throughout the late 15th and early 16th century.
Degen were not usually issued as ordnance weapons, but purchased privately as secondary weapons by soldiers. For this reason, there never emerged a definite standard form, and variations in hilt and blade design remained the rule from their inception in the 13th century until the weapon's decline in the 17th century.

Use of the weapon has parallels to the fencing with the German , and indeed the section on the basler in Wittenwiler's treatise takes the place of the Messer section in comparable German manuscripts (Wittenwiler treats  techniques alongside the longsword, rondel dagger, 
Swiss dagger  and unarmed ringen).

See also
Swiss arms and armour
List of sword types
List of daggers
Swiss saber
Fascine knife

References

Hugo Schneider, Waffen im Schweizerischen Landesmuseum vol. 1 (1980).
W. Blum, "Der Schweizerdegen", Anzeiger für schweizerische Altertumskunde : Neue Folge = Indicateur d'antiquités suisses : Nouvelle série 21.2, 21.3  (1919).

Old Swiss Confederacy
Medieval European swords
Renaissance-era swords
Weapons of Switzerland